Ascidieria is a genus of flowering plants from the orchid family, Orchidaceae. It is native to Thailand, Malaysia, Indonesia and the Philippines.

Species
At present (May 2014) the following species are recognized:

 Ascidieria caricifolia (J.J.Wood) J.J.Wood - Borneo
 Ascidieria cymbidifolia (Ridl.) W.Suarez & Cootes - Sumatra and Borneo
 Ascidieria grandis (Ridl.) J.J.Wood - Sabah
 Ascidieria longifolia (Hook.f.) Seidenf. - Thailand, Malaysia, Borneo, Sumatra
 Ascidieria maculiflora J.J.Wood - Sabah, Sarawak
 Ascidieria palawanensis (Ames) W.Suarez & Cootes - Palawan
 Ascidieria pseudocymbiformis (J.J.Wood) J.J.Wood - Sabah, Brunei, Sarawak
 Ascidieria zamboangensis (Ames) W.Suarez & Cootes - Mindanao

See also 
 List of Orchidaceae genera

References 

 Pridgeon, A.M., Cribb, P.J., Chase, M.A. & Rasmussen, F. eds. (1999). Genera Orchidacearum 1. Oxford Univ. Press.
 Pridgeon, A.M., Cribb, P.J., Chase, M.A. & Rasmussen, F. eds. (2001). Genera Orchidacearum 2. Oxford Univ. Press.
 Pridgeon, A.M., Cribb, P.J., Chase, M.A. & Rasmussen, F. eds. (2003). Genera Orchidacearum 3. Oxford Univ. Press
 Berg Pana, H. 2005. Handbuch der Orchideen-Namen. Dictionary of Orchid Names. Dizionario dei nomi delle orchidee. Ulmer, Stuttgart

External links 

Podochileae genera
Orchids of Thailand
Orchids of Sumatra
Orchids of Borneo
Orchids of the Philippines
Orchids of Malaysia
Eriinae